Bälau is a municipality in the Breitenfelde collective municipality (Amt) located in the Lauenburg district (Kreis) in southeastern Schleswig-Holstein, Germany.

Bälau covers 6.50 square kilometers (1600 acres) which are mostly used for agriculture, with a relatively high proportion of forest. In addition to agricultural businesses, the village has a riding school and vacation apartments. It is a peaceful village, without a major road running through it, and a village green bordered by lime trees. Several well-preserved farmer's houses set the character for the village.

References

Herzogtum Lauenburg